A by-election was held for the New South Wales Legislative Assembly electorate of Sydney City ion 30 December 1856 because of the resignation of Henry Parkes due to financial difficulties with his newspaper The Empire.

Dates

Result

The by-election was caused by the resignation of Henry Parkes due to financial difficulties with his newspaper The Empire.

See also
Electoral results for the district of Sydney City
List of New South Wales state by-elections

References

1856 elections in Australia
New South Wales state by-elections
1850s in New South Wales